Swackhamer is a surname. Notable people with the surname include:

Deborah Swackhamer (1954–2021), American environmental scientist
E. W. Swackhamer (1927–1994), American television and film director
William D. Swackhamer (1915–2008), American politician